Oreobliton is a monotypic genus of flowering plants belonging to the family Amaranthaceae. The only species is Oreobliton thesioides.

Its native range is Northwestern Africa.

References

Amaranthaceae
Amaranthaceae genera
Monotypic Caryophyllales genera